Dead Inside is the eighth album by The Golden Palominos, released on October 8, 1996, by Restless Records. It was the group's final studio album until the release of A Good Country Mile sixteen years later.

Track listing

Personnel 
Musicians
Nicole Blackman – spoken word
Knox Chandler – guitar, acoustic guitar
Anton Fier – drums, percussion, production, art direction
Bill Laswell – bass guitar
Nicky Skopelitis – guitar on "Ride"

Production and additional personnel
John Brown – art direction
Greg Calbi – mastering
Bruce Calder – recording
Dan Gellert – mixing, recording

References

External links 
 

1996 albums
The Golden Palominos albums
Restless Records albums
Albums produced by Anton Fier